Nacanieli Qerewaqa Takayawa (born 4 October 1975) is a Fijian judoka.

He won gold in the men's heavyweight event at the 2002 Commonwealth Games in Manchester. Qerewaqa also competed at the 1992, 1996 and 2000 Summer Olympics.

References

External links

1975 births
Living people
Fijian male judoka
Olympic judoka of Fiji
Judoka at the 1992 Summer Olympics
Judoka at the 1996 Summer Olympics
Judoka at the 2000 Summer Olympics
Judoka at the 2002 Commonwealth Games
I-Taukei Fijian people
Commonwealth Games medallists in judo
Commonwealth Games gold medallists for Fiji
20th-century Fijian people
21st-century Fijian people
Medallists at the 2002 Commonwealth Games